Ionuț Alin Rada (born 6 July 1982) is a Romanian retired footballer who played as a centre-back or a left-back.

After starting out with hometown club FC Universitatea Craiova, Rada played for București - Ilfov sides Rocar, Rapid, Național, Steaua and Otopeni until 2010, when he moved abroad for the first time with a brief stint at Al-Nasr. He returned to Romania the same year to sign for CFR Cluj, and also represented Karlsruher SC, Bari, Fidelis Andria and Sănătatea Cluj before retiring in 2020.

Internationally, Rada amassed two caps for the Romania national team between 2003 and 2004.

Club career

FC Universitatea Craiova
Rada started his career playing for FC Universitatea Craiova's youth team and also played for Gheorghe Popescu's famous football school from Craiova.

He debuted in Liga I for Universitatea Craiova playing only four matches being loaned to AS Rocar București.

He returned to Universitatea Craiova and played there until 2004, scoring 1 goal in 42 appearances.

Rocar București
He played for AS Rocar București 13 matches but did not manage to score any goals. He was then brought back to Universitatea Craiova

Rapid București
In 2004, he joined Rapid București along with his teammate from Universitatea Craiova, Ionut Stancu. From Rapid he was loaned one season to Progresul București, where he gained 14 appearances and scored two goals, one of the two goals was against his current team Steaua București. That goal made Walter Zenga, Steaua București's manager at that time, resign.

On 27 July 2006, Rada suffered an injury and missed the start of the season. He spent a month under treatment at the Isokinetic clinic in Bologna. He was left out of the team for the first time on 26 November 2006 by Razvan Lucescu because of his performance against Mladá Boleslav in the UEFA Cup.

George Copos, Rapid's owner, increased Rada's salary from €60,000 to €120,000 on 21 February 2007, due to his good performance. He was one of the lowest paid players from Rapid until his salary was doubled.

He played for Rapid in 65 matches and scored three goals. His best performance at this club was the quarter-finals of the UEFA Cup.

Steaua București
Rada signed with Steaua București on 25 July 2007 for three years. Steaua București transferred him for a known fee of €800,000 but because the player was 50% owned by former Romanian football player Gheorghe Popescu, the club had to pay him another €800,000 thus resulting a total transfer fee of €1,600,000. Popescu said that he was mainly responsible for Rada's transfer to Steaua București.

He was put on the transfer list by his former club Rapid because the fans believed that the player did not give a 100% for the respective club. With his agreement and with the acknowledgment of George Copos he was put on the transfer list.

Rada currently earns €120,000 per season, but he said that the money is not important to him because it was his dream to play for Steaua in the UEFA Champions League. He was sure that he made the right choice because he also had offers from other teams.

He scored his first goal for Steaua București against FC Vaslui in the current season of Liga I. He scored with a perfect header from a corner kick served by Banel Nicolita. The match ended with the score 1–0 for Steaua București. He made his debut in the UEFA Champions League group stage against Slavia Prague, match lost by Steaua București with 2–1.

He was loaned by his choice to CS Otopeni.

On 28 December 2009 Steaua announced that Rada was sold to Al-Nasr.

Al-Nasr
On 28 December 2009 he signed on a year and half with Al-Nasr.

CFR Cluj
On 11 June 2010, he signed with Romanian Champions CFR Cluj for three seasons. His first match was against FC Basel in 2010–11 UEFA Champions League when he scored his first goal.

Bari
On 19 January 2015, he signed a contract with Serie B outfit Bari, reuniting with former CFR Cluj sports director Razvan Zamfir.

Fidelis Andria
In August 2016, it was announced Rada signed a 2-years deal with the Serie C side Fidelis Andria.

International career
He was selected by Anghel Iordănescu to play for the Romania's national team, making his debut on 20 August 2003 when he came as a substitute and replaced Răzvan Raț in the 88th minute of a friendly which ended with a 2–0 victory against Ukraine. On 18 February 2004 he earned his second appearance in a 3–0 victory against Georgia at the Cyprus International Football Tournament.

Honours
Rapid București
Cupa României: 2005–06, 2006–07
Supercupa României: 2006

CFR Cluj
Liga I: 2011–12
Cupa României runner-up: 2012–13
Supercupa României runner-up: 2012

References

External links
 Official website 
 
 
 
 

1982 births
Sportspeople from Craiova
Living people
Romanian footballers
Romania international footballers
Romania under-21 international footballers
Association football defenders
FC U Craiova 1948 players
AFC Rocar București players
FC Progresul București players
FC Rapid București players
FC Steaua București players
CS Otopeni players
Al-Nasr SC (Dubai) players
CFR Cluj players
Karlsruher SC players
S.S.C. Bari players
S.S. Fidelis Andria 1928 players
Liga I players
UAE Pro League players
2. Bundesliga players
Serie B players
Serie C players
Romanian expatriate footballers
Expatriate footballers in the United Arab Emirates
Expatriate footballers in Germany
Expatriate footballers in Italy